Battle Arena Nitoshinden is a spin-off game from the Battle Arena Toshinden series and was only released in Japan. The game was to be released in the US under the name of Toshinden Kids but was canceled. 

Nitoshinden features super deformed characters, similar to those in Virtua Fighter Kids. The title  is a combination of the franchise's name  with the term .

Gameplay
The gameplay of Nitoshinden is different from the main series. Each characters' move list has been reduced to 6 attacks; 4 standard attacks, a special attack and a desperation attack.

The normal attacks roughly correspond to standard Toshinden attacks. There is a hard attack, light attack, low attack and either a medium or 360 degree attack (depending on the character). There is no real combo ability but some attacks can be chained together.

The game features a different defense system to standard Toshinden games. The side step moves still exist, however blocking of other attacks is now done with a parry button that repels an opponent's attack, stunning them for a short time.

Areas in Nitoshinden are all school-based locations and feature walled-in arenas, similar to Battle Arena Toshinden 3.

Characters
Baifu
Eiji
Ellis
Sofia
Ryuji
Rika
Shu
Tracy
Vermilion

References 

1996 video games
3D fighting games
Battle Arena Toshinden
Japan-exclusive video games
Multiplayer video games
PlayStation (console) games
PlayStation (console)-only games
Takara video games
Video games developed in Japan